Howard R. O'Daniels (December 19, 1907 – January 23, 1991) was an American football, basketball, and baseball coach and college athletics administrator. He served as the head football (1933–1941, 1946–1947), men's basketball (1941–1942), and baseball (1942, 1956–1957) coach at California Polytechnic School—now known as California Polytechnic State University, San Luis Obispo.

O'Daniels was born on December 19, 1907 in Seattle. He played college football at Santa Clara University in the late 1920s. O'Daniels died on January 23, 1991, at a hospital in San Luis Obispo, California.

Head coaching record

College football

References

1907 births
1991 deaths
American football tackles
Cal Poly Mustangs athletic directors
Cal Poly Mustangs football coaches
Cal Poly Mustangs baseball coaches
Cal Poly Mustangs men's basketball coaches
Santa Clara Broncos football players
High school football coaches in California
Players of American football from Seattle